Carveboarding is a boardsport on hard surfaces such as roads and sidewalks. Carveboarding combines aspects of  surfing, snowboarding, and skateboarding. The carveboard is like a skateboard, but riding it looks and feels more like surfing and snowboarding.

Anatomy 

The board is connected to the trucks by small hinges that allow to tilt the board relative to the horizontal. Thus, the board can tilt up to about 45°; much more than conventional skateboard trucks. This allows a much more aggressive turn attack, limiting the speed loss in each curve (carving). Compared to skateboarding, it is easier to accelerate without pressing a foot on the ground when carveboarding / surfskating (which is known as tic-tac for skateboarding and requires to keep the front wheels off the ground).

The possibility of instantaneous change of edge (Rail To Rail), allows to gain speed by flexion-extension as found in "shortboard" surfing and snowboarding. This is the "carving" effect that allows the development of necessary skills to advance one's surfing and snowboarding.

Emulation of other boardsports 

Like skateboarding in its infancy, carveboarding seeks to give some specific sensations from surfing. These are also found in some practices of snowboarding (which is no surprise given the history of the latter). Unlike the freebord and T-board, which have been specifically developed to emulate skateboard type of snowboarding, the carveboard was developed by a surfer/snowboarder for surfers/snowboarders.

Reference 

Surf culture
Boardsports